David Clayton is a statistician and epidemiologist.

David Clayton may also refer to:

David Clayton (visual effects), visual effects supervisor
Sir David Robert Clayton, 12th Baronet, of Marden (1936–2021), of the Clayton baronets

See also
David Clayton-Thomas
David Clayton Rogers
Clayton (surname)